General William J. Palmer High School, commonly referred to as Palmer High School (PHS), is a public high school in Colorado Springs, Colorado, United States. It is the flagship high school of School District 11 and has the oldest International Baccalaureate (IB) program in the area.

History

Gender-inclusive bathrooms
In 2016 senior Doe Schall, a genderqueer student, along with others from the school's Gay-Straight-Trans Alliance, lobbied school officials for gender-inclusive bathrooms due to the discrimination experienced by transgender students. Palmer was the first high school in Southern Colorado to have gender-inclusive bathrooms.

Extracurricular activities

Mock Trial
Palmer's Mock Trial program won the Southern Colorado Regional Competition in 2008, 2009, 2010, 2011, 2012, 2014, and 2015; the Colorado State Competition in 2009 and 2013; and took 14th place in the National High School Mock Trial Tournament in 2013.

Notable alumni

 Lance Armstrong (graduated elsewhere)
 Albert Balows (1921–2006), clinical microbiologist
 Patricia Louise Dudley (1947, as Colorado Springs High School), zoologist specializing in copepods
 Chris Fowler (1980), host of ESPN's College Gameday
 Robert L. Gordon III, (1975) Deputy Undersecretary of Defense for Military Community and Family Policy
 Robert M. Isaac (1945, as Colorado Springs High School), mayor of Colorado Springs
 Reggie Jackson (2008), basketball player for the Los Angeles Clippers of the NBA
 Ray Jardine (1961), rock climber, adventurer, inventor of "Friends" spring-loaded camming device
 Cassandra Peterson (1969), actress; played Elvira, Mistress of the Dark
 Laura Veirs, singer-songwriter

References

External links
 

High schools in Colorado Springs, Colorado
International Baccalaureate schools in Colorado
Works Progress Administration in Colorado
School buildings completed in 1940
Public high schools in Colorado
Educational institutions established in 1874
1874 establishments in Colorado Territory